Popular Songs Of Great Enduring Strength And Beauty is a compilation album by American alternative rock group
Camper Van Beethoven released in 2008 on the Cooking Vinyl label.

Track listing
The Day That Lassie Went To The Moon (3:13)  [from Telephone Free Landslide Victory (1985)]
Border Ska (2:50)  [from Telephone Free Landslide Victory (1985)]
Take the Skinheads Bowling (2:28)  [from Telephone Free Landslide Victory (1985)]
Pictures Of Matchstick Men (4:08) [re-recorded, original version from Key Lime Pie (1989)]
Skinhead Stomp (1:48)  [from Telephone Free Landslide Victory (1985)]
Opie Rides Again/Club Med Sucks (3:53)  [from Telephone Free Landslide Victory (1985)]
Eye of Fatima Parts 1 & 2 (4:55)   [re-recorded, original version from Our Beloved Revolutionary Sweetheart (1988)]
ZZ Top Goes To Egypt (3:08)  [from II & III (1986)]
Sad Lover's Waltz (4:09)  [from II & III (1986)]
When I Win The Lottery (3:37)  [re-recorded, original version from Key Lime Pie (1989)]
The History Of Utah (2:52)  [from Camper Van Beethoven (1986)]
Seven Languages (4:07) [from Vampire Can Mating Oven (1987)]
All Her Favourite Fruit (8:41)  [re-recorded, original version from Key Lime Pie (1989)]
Good Guys And Bad Guys	(4:49)  [from Camper Van Beethoven (1986)]
Circles (3:03)  [from II & III (1986)]
One Of These Days (3:26)   [re-recorded, original version from Our Beloved Revolutionary Sweetheart (1988)]
Ambiguity Song	(2:29)  [from Telephone Free Landslide Victory (1985)]
Shut Us Down (1:16)  [from Camper Van Beethoven (1986)]

References

External links
 
 

Camper Van Beethoven albums
2008 compilation albums